"Double, Double, Boy in Trouble" is the third episode of the twentieth season of the American animated television series The Simpsons. It first aired on the Fox network in the United States on October 19, 2008 and in the United Kingdom on November 30, 2008. Bart meets a rich boy named Simon Woosterfield, who happens to be Bart's exact look-alike. Because of this, the two decide to switch homes; Simon enjoys his time with the Simpsons while Bart discovers his rich new half-brother and sister are out to kill Simon, so they can inherit the vast Woosterfield family fortune. Former NFL football player Joe Montana guest stars as himself.

In its original airing, the episode garnered 8.09 million viewers.

Plot
Homer, Bart and Maggie are at the Kwik-E Mart, where Apu tries to get Homer to buy the last lottery ticket by claiming that the last ticket is always lucky. When Homer is about to take money out to buy the ticket, Bart attempts to jump off a shelf and land in Chief Wiggum's cart full of marshmallows. However, Wiggum moves the cart and Homer has to race over to catch his son, while Lenny walks up to the counter and buys that last ticket. Lenny wins $50,000, which makes Homer jealous. At Moe's Tavern, Lenny announces he is going to spend his winnings on a giant party at the Woosterfield Hotel for all of his friends. Back at home, the Simpson family cannot find Bart when it is time to leave, because he is upstairs in the attic with a water gun full of cat urine. When he is about to shoot it at Rod and Todd Flanders in a wagon below, Marge steps in and Bart accidentally sprays her with the urine, so Marge has to wear a mediocre "back up dress" to the party. Homer and Marge wonder why Bart cannot behave and wonder if he went bad in utero when pregnant Marge accidentally swallowed a small drop of champagne after Mayor Quimby christened a new Navy vessel, the U.S.S. Float-and-Shoot. At Lenny's party, Bart discovers that Lenny will give out vacuuming robots in gift bags. Bart activates all the dangerous settings on them and they attack the party guests. When everyone finds out that Bart is responsible, Marge takes away Bart's non-dice board game privileges, after Bart says she already took away his TV and video game privileges. In the bathroom, Bart meets Simon Woosterfield, a kid who is both Bart's exact look-alike and part of a billionaire family.

The boys decide to secretly switch places and live each other's lives for a while by trading their clothes in the bathroom. Bart likes his new life as a rich child until he meets his paternal half-siblings, Devan and Quenly, who resent Simon for blocking their full inheritance of the family fortune, especially since his father divorced their mother and married his mother. Simon refuses to eat Marge's recipe of cooked noodles with root beer and Cheetos, so Homer eats it and chews with his mouth open. When Simon is sent to bed without supper after calling Homer a spew monkey for spitting food on him, Marge gives him pizza with no crusts and tucks him in, which Simon says he can get used to. The next day, the Woosterfields hold a party for all of their rich friends. When Devan and Quenly lock Bart in the Woosterfield mausoleum telling him that the bodies turn to candy, Mr. Burns gets him out. He tells Bart he was once the youngest in a wealthy family and his siblings all died in varied ways (mostly related to eating poisoned baked potatoes) and that Bart is in danger from his own family. Bart realizes that Devan and Quenly want to murder Simon so they can take his share of the inheritance.

When Simon listens politely to Grampa's stories, Lisa concludes that Simon is an imposter and Simon explains his story to the Simpsons, saying that Devan and Quenly are taking Bart to Aspen where they will try to kill him. Before the Simpsons get to him, Quenly pushes Bart down a hill for experienced skiers. When Devan says that they will split Simon's inheritance, Quenly offers Devan a baked potato (a reference to Burns' story from earlier) planning to clear her path of him to snare 100% of the fortune for herself. Homer manages to save Bart in time. The family says their goodbye to Simon, who is welcomed to his family again via a hot fudge sundae by his butler Chester. Newly appreciative of his own family, Bart is lovingly tucked into bed by Marge.

Cultural references

The episode's plot is a parody of Daphne du Maurier's novel The Scapegoat, while Simon's horse Shadowfax is named after Gandalf's horse from The Lord of the Rings series. and is also based on The Prince and the Pauper by Mark Twain. The episode's couch gag, with the family being swept up in a tornado and taken to a black and white farm is a reference to The Wizard of Oz. Additionally, Apu has an issue of Tales From the Kwik-E-Mart, a parody of the comic series Tales from the Crypt. Early in the episode, Homer makes a reference to Dennis the Menace.

One sequence features Bart passing the mansions of several celebrities, including actor Macaulay Culkin (shown in his scream pose from the 1990 film Home Alone), Fleetwood Mac's Mick Fleetwood and Stevie Nicks (shown posing in the same way as the cover of their 1977 album Rumours), and "McDreamy" and "McSteamy", referring to the characters Derek Shepherd and Mark Sloan from the medical drama series Grey's Anatomy, as well as an actual McDonald's restaurant.  Inside the Woosterfield mansion, Simon's room features a ceiling from one of Saddam Hussein's palaces.

Songs featured in the episode include "Thank You for Being a Friend" by Andrew Gold, the song used as the opening to the series The Golden Girls, which Lenny sings. Marge sings "Scrubbing You" while washing up, to the tune of Minnie Riperton's "Lovin' You" and the "Notre Dame Victory March" plays when Joe Montana appears.

Reception
The episode had an approximate 8.09 million viewers.

Robert Canning of IGN said, "It was a far from groundbreaking episode, to be sure, but our familiarity of the characters and the fair amount of laughs made for yet another pleasurable viewing experience". He went on to state, "The story as a whole was interesting and the jokes were funny enough to elicit several audible guffaws" and rated the episode a 7.8 out of 10.

Erich Asperschlager of TV Verdict said, "'Double Double' scores a solid B on the laugh-o-meter. While there weren't many guffaws, I chuckled more than a few times."

References

External links

The Simpsons (season 20) episodes
2008 American television episodes
Television episodes about social class
Works based on The Prince and the Pauper